William Roger Reaves is an American pilot who alleges that he was one of the most prolific drug smugglers in history. He worked for Pablo Escobar and the Medellín Cartel. Reaves employed Barry Seal as a  pilot in many of his drug-smuggling operations.
In his memoir, Smuggler (2016), Reaves claims that Seal paid millions in bribes to the Clintons when Bill Clinton was governor of Arkansas in order to land planes carrying  cocaine at Mena, Arkansas.

Reaves served over thirty cumulative years in prison and escaped five times. He spent time in German, Australian, and American penal institutions, while supported by his wife throughout. He was shot down twice while in an aircraft and was tortured in a Mexican jail. In his own words, he is an "adventurous person".

Book
 Smuggler (2016)

References

External links
 
 
 

Medellín Cartel
Living people

Year of birth missing (living people)